Elcor may refer to:

 Elcor, Minnesota, a ghost town, United States
 an alien species from the Universe of Mass Effect